The rufous-crowned tody-flycatcher (Poecilotriccus ruficeps) is a species of bird in the family Tyrannidae, the tyrant flycatchers. It was formerly placed in the genus Todirostrum, and has been known as the rufous-crowned tody-tyrant.
It is found in thickets and second growth in the Andes of Venezuela, Colombia, Ecuador and far northern Peru.

References

External links

"Rufous-crowned tody-tyrant" photo gallery VIREO Photo-High Res
"Rufous-crowned tody-flycatcher"-Photo-High Res; Article tropicalbirding–"Northern Ecuador"

rufous-crowned tody-flycatcher
Birds of the Colombian Andes
Birds of the Ecuadorian Andes
Birds of the Venezuelan Andes
rufous-crowned tody-flycatcher
Taxonomy articles created by Polbot